The Gildersleeve House was a house located at 108 Broadway in Hudson, Illinois. Settler James T. Gildersleeve built the Greek Revival house for his family in 1836. Gildersleeve founded the village of Hudson and named it after the area of New York where he formerly lived. The house was the village's first frame house and was its finest home in its early years; as a result, it hosted local events and was the village's first post office. Gildersleeve planted five oak trees outside the house; the trees grew together at their base, giving the house the name "Five Oaks". The house was demolished in 2000.

The house was added to the National Register of Historic Places on July 28, 1977, and was delisted in 2020.

Notes

National Register of Historic Places in McLean County, Illinois
Houses in McLean County, Illinois
Houses on the National Register of Historic Places in Illinois
Former National Register of Historic Places in Illinois
Buildings and structures demolished in 2000
Demolished buildings and structures in Illinois